On November 7, 2006, the state of Alaska held its general elections.  On the ballot were races for U.S Representative, Governor and Lieutenant Governor, 10 of 20 seats in the Alaska Senate, all 40 seats in the Alaska House of Representatives, 2 ballot measures, plus retention elections for 18 judges of the Alaska Superior Court and 13 judges of the Alaska District Court.

In the tables below, bold indicates the winners, while italics indicates the incumbents.

Federal races

U.S. Representative election

State races

Alaska gubernatorial election

State Senate elections

Analysis

State Senate results

State House elections

Analysis

State House results

References

See also
 2006 United States House of Representatives election in Alaska
 2006 Alaska gubernatorial election